Pashto cinema(), refers to the Pashto-language film industry of Pakistani cinema based in Peshawar, Khyber Pakhtunkhwa, Pakistan.

Origins
Yousuf Khan Sher Bano was the first-ever Pashto film produced in Pakistan and released in theaters on 1 December 1970. It was directed by Aziz Tabassum, with debut stars Yasmin Khan and Badar Munir. The story is based on the Pashto folk story Yousuf Khan and Sher Bano and completed 50 weeks at number 1 in Peshawar.

Revival
In 2015, Sanober Qaiser's film Sartez Badmash was released at two cinemas in Kabul and Pakhtun Pay Dubai was released in Dubai as well as Kabul. In 2013, the first high definition Pashto film Zama Arman was released. After 35 years, in 2015 the Pashto film industry released seven new movies, thus breaking all previous records of film production. All films were screened at the cinemas in Peshawar, Mingora, Mardan, Kohat and even in a few theatres of Karachi city. The movies released were Ma Cheera Gharib Sara, Sar-Teza Badmash, Daagh, Mayeen kho Lewani vee, Khanadani Badmash, Pukhtoon pa Dubai ke and I Love You too. Shama cinema in Peshawar is popular. Reham Khan's movie Janaan has won awards for its screenplay. Naz cinema was first to provide 3D digital movie experience at Peshawar.

Films

References

External links
 IMDb database of films in the Pashtu language

 
Culture of Khyber Pakhtunkhwa